Hoërskool Bellville (Bellville High School) is a public Afrikaans medium co-educational high school situated in Bellville in the Western Cape province of South Africa, It is one of the top schools in the Western Cape province, It was founded in 1937.

Background

The school was established in 1937.

Headmasters

The school had the following principals: C.J. Grové 1937- 1949, R. Coetzee –1949-1970, D.L. van den Berg 1971- 1973, G.F.P. Kellerman 1974–1983, C.E. van Staden 1983–1985, A.C. Lombard 1986- 1996, J.P. Crous 1997- 2010, and currently D. du Plessis.

Athletics

Hoërskool Bellville annually participates in the MTBS athletics competition, along with three other schools from the Bellville area: D.F. Malan, Tygerberg and Stellenberg. MTBS is especially well known for the performance of these schools' non-participating pupils on the pavilion as they perform songs and cheers to encourage their athletes during the day - for which a trophy is also awarded. Bellville has won this singing section in 2003, 2004, 2006, 2008 and 2019.

Other events

In 2006 the school's team won the national SAGE competition in entrepreneurship when they made and sold items from pillow cases to tissue boxes. The final was in China and despite the contestants parents sometimes being unemployed the team of six flew off to compete after sponsorship was identified by minister Tasneem Essop.

The school also participates in a yearly Interschools event (week long derby) with its local rival D.F. Malan, in which the schools contest on most platforms - including Field hockey, Rugby, Netball, Cross country, Chess and Debate. The first team rugby, hockey and netball matches are the main events. In recent years, Bellville has strongly dominated the rugby (although D.F. Malan has won twice in the last 3 years), with D.F. Malan strongly dominating both Boys' and Girls' hockey (although Bellville won the 2012 girls hockey match). In 2017, the school produced Janke van Dyk, the top achieving matriculant in South Africa.

Alumni
Gene Louw, politician and cabinet minister. († 2015)

Dawie de Villiers, Springbok rugby player - scrumhalf and captain, preacher, ambassador in London, Minister of Trade and Industry. († 2022)

Hennie Bosman, karate expert and stunt man.

Carlü Sadie, Lions Rugby Union player - prop, represented South Africa U20 in 2016 and 2017 in the Junior Rugby World Cup.

Francois van Coke, lead vocalist in the band Fokofpolisiekar and Van Coke Kartel, and solo artist.

Janke van Dyk, the top achieving matriculant in South Africa in 2017.

References

External links
 

Schools in Cape Town
High schools in South Africa
Schools in the Western Cape